Vanasse is a surname. Notable people with the surname include:

 Deb Vanasse (born 1957), Alaska writer
Fabien Vanasse dit Vertefeuille (1850–1936), Canadian journalist, lawyer and politician
Karine Vanasse (born 1983), Canadian actress
René Vanasse (1921–1996), Canadian businessman
Bob Vanasse, co-founder of Vanasse Hangen Brustlin, Inc.